Piotr Petrovich Miklashevich (born 18 October 1954) is a Belarusian politician, currently serving as Head of the Constitutional Court of Belarus.

Career 
Milakshevich is Chair of the Commission behind the 2022 constitutional referendum.

Milakshevich is sanctioned by the European Union and the United States.

References 

Living people
1954 births
Belarusian individuals subject to the U.S. Department of the Treasury sanctions
Belarusian judges
20th-century Belarusian people
21st-century Belarusian people
21st-century Belarusian politicians
Belarusian State University alumni